The Orion VI was a low-floor transit bus available in 40' lengths manufactured by Ontario Bus Industries (renamed Orion Bus Industries in 1995) between 1995 and 2003. The Orion VI was intended to provide an alternative to the existing high-floor Orion V; both the V and VI were replaced by the partially low-floor Orion VII (introduced in 2001).

Unlike competing low-floor buses, which package the drivetrain components in an rear underfloor compartment, resulting in a step and raised floor near the rear axle, the Orion VI had its drivetrain in a compartment occupying the rear corner of the bus, with the low floor extending all the way back to the rear of the bus. In addition, the Orion VI was the first North American bus to be offered with a hybrid powertrain option, in 1998.

Design
Orion Bus Industries (OBI) introduced the Orion VI at the American Public Transit Association Expo in 1993. The two-piece windshield of the Orion VI, similar to the design of the Orion V and first-generation Orion VII, has the driver's windshield canted towards the back of the bus to reduce reflections. The bus was offered with up to three side doors, and with a choice of Diesel or compressed natural gas (CNG) engines. The engine compartment of the Orion VI completely occupies the rear corner on the driver's side of the bus. 

The layout of a typical North American low-floor transit bus has the low floor over most of the interior, extending from the front door to the rear door; behind the rear door, steps lead up to an elevated section to provide clearance for the engine and rear axle. The Orion VI offered a "true" or "full" low-floor, in which the low floor covers the entire length. Although the bus offered more overall capacity (including standees) than the competing New Flyer D40LF, which used the typical partial low-floor layout, the D40LF had approximately 10% more seats, as the Orion VI offered very few seats behind the rear axle. In a study performed by New York City Transit, the Orion VI had the fewest seats (28) compared with a New Flyer D40LF (39) and a conventional RTS bus (40); despite the ease of entry and exit, customers felt the low-floor bus had the least room and preferred the RTS.

The Orion VI uses a welded semi-monocoque steel frame clad with aluminum and fiberglass panels. To facilitate the full low-floor design, the suspension features an independent front design using MacPherson struts and an inverted rear portal axle.

OBI marketed the Orion VI to both the Canadian and United States transit markets. Canadian buses were assembled at the OBI plant in Mississauga, Ontario. For the US market, to meet 'Buy America' requirements for federally subsidized transit vehicles, the Orion VI was partially assembled at Mississauga, then shipped to Oriskany, New York for final assembly by wholly owned subsidiary Bus Industries of America (BIA).

Internally, OBI designated the bus model as 06.501.

Hybrid
A prototype series hybrid bus was developed by the New York State Consortium using an Orion V 40' chassis equipped with powertrain components supplied by General Electric. This hybrid bus prototype used tandem rear axles driven by four traction motors, one for each wheel. Electric traction power was generated by a Cummins B5.9 diesel engine rated at  driving a  alternator, and energy from regenerative braking was stored in nickel-cadmium batteries.

In 1998, the Orion VI became the first North American transit bus to be offered with a hybrid powertrain as a regular production option. The New York City (NYC) Metropolitan Transportation Authority was the lead customer, with an order of 125 Orion VI Hybrid buses planned for delivery in 2002. The series hybrid powertrain, developed from the Orion V prototype by Lockheed Martin and marketed as HybriDrive™, differed in adopting a single rear axle driven by one traction motor, storing energy in lead-acid batteries, and using a Detroit Diesel Series 30 (a co-branded Navistar T444E) V-8 diesel engine turning a generator. A pilot fleet of 10 Orion VI Hybrid buses was sold in 1998 to MTA for $5.6 million.

During durability testing at Altoona, Pennsylvania, the roof-mounted battery packs failed shortly after the bus was received, resulting in a prolonged unavailability of more than 1000 hours, and the traction motor failed three times.

Deployment
The Orion VI was mostly sold in Canada. Major transit agency users included New York City (MTA), Ottawa (OC Transpo) and Toronto (TTC).

TTC retired its Orion VI fleet in 2006 after less than ten years of service. The Orion VI for TTC had been purchased with CNG engines, and rather than convert them to diesel (as it was doing with the preceding Orion V fleet), TTC opted to retire the buses.

Several Orion VI buses caught fire (WMATA, 2012; LACMTA, 2018) resulting in the idling of the entire Orion VI fleet for those transit agencies. The United States National Highway Traffic Safety Administration also received separate complaints of tires catching fire in Arlington Heights, Illinois (2004) and Birmingham, Alabama (2005). In addition, a loose hydraulic pump fitting resulted in an engine fire for WMATA in 2010.

Sault Ste. Marie Transit Services was the final Canadian operator of the Orion VI, operating former 1999-built OC Transpo units that were acquired in 2013, with retirement occurring in mid-to-late 2021.

Competition
 Gillig Low Floor
 NABI LFW
 New Flyer Low Floor
 Nova Bus LF Series

References

External links

 
 

Buses of Canada
Buses of the United States
Vehicles introduced in 1995